Stargate Studios is an American post-production studio founded in 1989 by cinematographer and special visual effects supervisor Sam Nicholson.

It is a production company offering visual effects and production services to the film and television industry with studios in Los Angeles, Toronto, Vancouver, Atlanta, Malta, London, Cologne, Dubai, and Mexico City.

Stargate Digital filmography

Currently in production 

 The 45 Rules of Divorce
 The Black Phone
 Burn Your Maps
 Fear the Walking Dead
 Girlfriends' Guide to Divorce
 Good Trouble
 Grey's Anatomy
 House of Lies
 Hustlers
 HBO's Run
 Motive
 Ray Donovan
 The Resident
 Pure Genius
 Solos
 Station 19
 The Walking Dead (2011, 2012, 2014, 2015 Primetime Emmy Nomination for Outstanding Special Visual Effects)
 Telenovela
 Our Flag Means Death

Completed projects
 12 Monkeys
 24
 About a Boy
 An American Carol
 A Night in Old Mexico
 "Atlas Shrugged: Part 1"
 "Atlas Shrugged: Who Is John Galt?"
 Bates Motel
 Betty in NY
 Bobby
 Carpoolers
 Charlie's Angels: Full Throttle
 Coke
 CSI: NY
 Comanche Moon (2008 Primetime Emmy Nomination for Outstanding Special Visual Effects)
 Degrassi: The Next Generation
 Dirty Sexy Money
 The Divide
 Defying Gravity (2010 Visual Effects Society Nomination for Outstanding Special Visual Effects for a Broadcast Series)
 The Dead Zone
 Doctor Who
 Eli Stone
 The Event
 ER
 Fairly Legal
 Gilmore Girls
 The Glades
 Gracepoint
 Gettysburg
 Greek
 Hannibal
 Happy Town
 How It's Made: Dream Cars
 Haven (2016 Canadian Screen Awards Nomination for Best Visual Effects)
 Hemlock Grove
 Heroes (2009 Primetime Emmy Award for Outstanding Special Visual Effects)
 Heroes Reborn
 High School Musical 3
 Home Alone: The Holiday Heist
 Into the Grizzly Maze
 Into the West
 In Plain Sight
 The Killing
 Knight Rider
 Kyle XY
 Las Vegas
 Mad Men
 Matador
 Mob City
 Monk
 Nightmares and Dreamscapes: From the Stories of Stephen King (2007 Primetime Emmy Award for Outstanding Special Visual Effects)
 Nikita
 NCIS
 NCIS
 October Road
 The Office
 Parenthood
 Parks and Recreation
 Phantom
 Pan Am
 Private Practice
 Rush
 Revenge
 Reaper
 Samurai Girl
 Star Trek
 Star Trek II: The Wrath of Khan
 Saving Grace
 Spartacus
 Sliders
 Reaper
 Touch
 Trauma
 Ugly Betty

External links
 
 

Visual effects companies
Computer animation
Entertainment companies established in 1989
Privately held companies based in California